Aleksandar Vasoski (born 21 November 1979) is a Macedonian professional football manager and former player.

Club career
Born in Skopje, Vasoski played for local clubs, most notably Vardar and Cementarnica. He played for Bundesliga outfit Eintracht Frankfurt from 2005 to 2011. After parting with Frankfurt, Vasoski decided to retire from playing due to numerous knee injuries.

International career
Vasoski made his senior debut for the Macedonia national team in a July 2000 friendly match against Azerbaijan and has earned a total of 34 caps, scoring 2 goals. His final international was a November 2008 friendly against Montenegro.

Managerial career

Early career
Vasoski previously worked as the youth team manager and coordinator of Metalurg Skopje and Vardar. On 16 July 2018, he became the new manager of Vardar, winning the Macedonian First League in the 2019–20 season with the club. Vasoski left Vardar in December 2020. He then worked as manager of Akademija Pandev from 2020 to 2022.

Sarajevo
On 8 January 2022, Bosnian Premier League club Sarajevo appointed Vasoski as manager. On 10 January 2022, he was officially confirmed as Sarajevo manager, signing a six-month contract, with an option to stay at the club until June 2023. Vasoski was victorious in his first Bosnian Premier League game as Sarajevo manager, winning 2–0 away against Leotar on 26 February 2022.

On 5 March 2022, he lost his first Sarajevo derby as a manager in a 2–0 defeat to Željezničar. On 10 April 2022, Vasoski managed Sarajevo to a 6–0 win against Rudar Prijedor, the club's biggest league win of the season. Following a series of poor results, which culminated with a 1–1 draw against rivals Željezničar, he resigned as manager on 10 May 2022.

Managerial statistics

Honours

Player
Vardar 
Macedonian First League: 2001–02, 2002–03

Eintracht Frankfurt
DFB-Pokal runner-up: 2005–06

Individual
Macedonian Footballer of the Year: 2004

Manager
Vardar 
Macedonian First League: 2019–20

References

External links

Aleksandar Vasoski at MacedonianFootball.com 
Aleksandar Vasoski at eintracht-archiv.de 

1979 births
Living people
Footballers from Skopje
Association football defenders
Macedonian footballers
North Macedonia international footballers
FK Vardar players
FK Cementarnica 55 players
Eintracht Frankfurt players
Macedonian First Football League players
2. Bundesliga players
Bundesliga players
Macedonian expatriate footballers
Expatriate footballers in Germany
Macedonian expatriate sportspeople in Germany
Macedonian football managers
Premier League of Bosnia and Herzegovina managers
FK Vardar managers
FK Sarajevo managers
Expatriate football managers in Bosnia and Herzegovina
Macedonian expatriate sportspeople in Bosnia and Herzegovina